In algebra, Freudenthal algebras are certain Jordan algebras constructed from composition algebras.

Definition

Suppose that C is a composition algebra over a field F and a is a diagonal matrix in GLn(F). A reduced Freudenthal algebra is defined to be a Jordan algebra equal to the set of 3 by 3 matrices X over C such that Ta=aX. A Freudenthal algebra is any twisted form of a reduced Freudental algebra.

References

 
 

Non-associative algebras